Brae is a settlement in Shetland, Scotland.

Brae in Scottish means protector of the high lands.

Places
 Brae Bay, Nunavut, Canada
 Brae Fell, a fell in the English Lake District
 Brae field, a Scottish oil field in the North Sea
 Skara Brae, a Neolithic settlement in Scotland

People and fictional characters
 Billy Brae, Scottish footballer in the 1920s/30s
 James Brae, English footballer in the 1890s
 June Brae (1917–2000), British ballet dancer
 Brae Marrack, a character in the British soap opera Echo Beach (TV series)

Acronyms
 British Antarctic Expedition (disambiguation) (BrAE)

Other
 Brae (restaurant), Australia